"Why Should I Cry Over You?" is a country music song written by Zeke Clements, sung by Eddy Arnold, and released on the RCA Victor label. In April 1950, it reached No. 3 on the country juke box chart. It spent 13 weeks on the charts and was the No. 16 juke box country record of 1950.

See also
 Billboard Top Country & Western Records of 1950

References

Eddy Arnold songs
1950 songs
Songs written by Zeke Clements